The following is a list of settlements in Zanzibar:

Unguja (Zanzibar) Island
Bondeni
Bububu
Bumbwini
Bwejuu
Chuini
Chukwani
Chwaka
Dimbani (Kizimkazi Dimbani)
Fukuchani
Fumba
Fuoni
Jambiani
Jendele
Jozani
Kae
Kendwa
Kibaoni
Kibweni
Kinyasini
Kitogani
Kiwengwa
Kizimkazi (Kizimkazi Mtendeni)
Koani
Mahonda
Makunduchi
Mangapwani
Matemwe
Mbweni
Mchangani
Michenzani
Mkokotoni
Mtoni
Mwana Kwerekwe
Mwembe Ladu
Mwera
Mzambarauni
Nungwi
Paje
Pete
Pingwe
Pongwe
Regezo Mwendo
Stone Town
Tunguu
Unguja Ukuu
Uroa
Zanzibar City

Tumbatu Island
Jongowe
Kichangani

Uzi Island
Uzi

Pemba Island
Chake-Chake
Chambani
Chwaka
Chwale
Daya
Gando
Jiso
Jondeni
Kendwa
Kengeja
Kisutu
Kiuyu
Konde
Likoni
Machomane
Mailitano
Makongeni
Maziwa Ngombe
Mchangani
Micheweni
Mkoani
Mtambile
Mtangani
Mtekofi
Mzambaraoni
Ngagu
Ole
Pujini
Verani
Vitongoji
Wambaa
Wesha
Wete

Kojani Island
Kojani

Zanzibar-related lists